Česká spořitelna is the biggest Czech bank measured by the number of clients (4.7 million)  with its headquarters in Prague. It is a part of the Erste Group, Austria.

History

Foundation of the Bank on the territory of the Austrian monarchy (1825–1844) 
The creation of the first savings banks in Europe occurred during the second half of the 18th century, when several such institutions were mainly situated in Germany and Switzerland. At the beginning of the 19th century, the idea of savings banks began to spread in Great Britain.  There, by the end of 1818, several hundred savings banks could be counted. The purpose of the savings banks was to be to help the poor manage their finances.

Around that time, the idea of savings banks began to attract interest in the Habsburg monarchy, and the result was the founding of Die Erste Oesterreichische Spar-Casse (The First Austrian Savings Bank) on 4 October 1819. This union was the first financial institution of its kind in the Austrian Empire. Its origins were very modest; initial capital was 8,717 florins, and only by the end of December 1822 did it increase to ƒ338,388. Subsequently, banks began to appear in other cities of the monarchy: Ljubljana (1820), Innsbruck, Bregenz (both 1822), and Hollabrunn (1824).

First Bank of Česká spořitelna in the Czech Lands 
In Prague, the initiative was led by the Prague policeman and director of the Governor's Council, Josef von Hoch, who submitted the first proposal for the creation of a Prague-based bank. The emergence of the bank was preceded by an appeal published in a newspaper in 1823, the underwriting of the main fund of the bank, which was supposed to be a guarantee for future depositors that they would not lose their money. The general minimum fund was set at 12,000 florins. The first to respond to the proposal was Prince Rudolf Colloredo, who invested 300 florins in the fund of the future bank. This sum was followed by 23 Czech nobles and other industrialists and entrepreneurs. The first group of contributors, with a contribution of 300 florins, were the nobles Franz Josef Graf Wrtby, August Lobkowitz, Jan Adolf II Schwarzenberg, Philip Kinski, Vratislav of Mitrovice and Prague Archbishop Vaclav Leopold Chlumchansky.

As with most other savings banks of those times, the purpose of the first Czech bank was to assist the poor sectors of the population. People had to keep certain amounts from which they received a small interest, and thus created stock in case of illness, old age or unemployment. The full name of this Prague bank in the Czech language was Savings Treasury (cashier) for the Capital City of Prague and Bohemia. However, a short name gradually caught on: Česká Spořitelna, in which the adjective "Czech" is indicated by the place of work of the bank. The new bank was at first  open for only a few days a week (on Monday, Wednesday and Saturday) from 9:00 to 12:00, and from 15:00 to 18:00, and with two rooms in the building of the Bohemian Diet. The bank did not move to its own office on Malostranské náměstí until 1845, at which time it was already open throughout the week.

As for deposits, it was possible to store money amounting to between 25 kreutzers to 100 florins. People received registered savings books. Percentages accounted for 4%, later 3%. The bank carried out only a few active operations (mortgage lending, operations with Austrian government securities and partial cash bills before the date of payment) so that people's savings would be secured.

The capital of the bank increased dramatically for a decade. In 1825, it was ƒ124,000; by 1830, it was ƒ1,573,000, and within ten years, ƒ8,087,000. In the same manner, its assets grew.

Austrian regulation 
Even at the beginning of 1840, the creation of Česká spořitelna was allowed by a special concession, but the need for a general law regulating the activities of the Bank arose. This law was adopted on September 26, 1844, when Austrian savings regulations were announced. It was a standard that, with minor amendments, was in place until the end of the Habsburg Empire.

The regulations were based on the idea that banks are social institutions that take over part of the government agenda, that is, the concern for the well-being of the people. Therefore, charitable societies were considered the most appropriate bases of banks. Active bank transactions were significantly reduced so that the institutions could avoid risk and therefore defend the savings of the population.

Even financial surpluses were to be primarily used to expand the reserve fund, and, to a lesser extent, support projects of general benefit (construction of schools, hospitals, etc.). But these good intentions held back the further development of the bank. The positive advantage of regulation was, above all, that it put the existence of savings banks on a solid legal framework.

Consolidation and expansion (1845–1918)

Establishment of Czech savings banks in the 1850s and 1860s 
The savings regulations of 1844 served to further the development of the bank. The first bank to open in another city was the bank in Aš (1847). Others were gradually added; at the turn of the 1850s and 1860s, there were about 20 such banks. However, these banks were German-speaking; as for the truly Czech-speaking savings bank, the bank in the city of Plzeň, which was opened in 1857, is considered to be the first. In the first half of 1860, there was more growth, and Czech-speaking banks opened all over Bohemia. Thus, the Czech-speaking banks almost equaled the German-speaking ones in number.

Changes in founders and clientele 
Initially, the founders of banks were charitable foundations, but gradually, state institutions became the founders. The conditions for accepting clients had also changed. Banks were originally intended for the poor. Now clients were mostly middle-class urban dwellers, which was reflected in the economic strength of the new banks.

Situation during World War I 
The First World War greatly affected banks. Already in 1909, depositors began to panic (there were reports of the beginning of the war with Serbia). Another alarm was in 1912, in connection with the war in the Balkans. The outbreak of the First World War caused a huge panic among the population, and people tried to withdraw their deposits, so on July 31, 1914, the government announced a moratorium on all large payments, which continued until the summer of 1915. However, the banks lost most of their cash in the first year of the war. Gradually, banks began to emerge from the crisis due to the creation of rural banks, which increased capital due to investments in rural enterprises during food shortages. As deposits in rural banks grew, the central balance improved, and the surplus was then invested in military loans.

Present day 
Česká spořitelna has approximately 5 million customers and is the largest bank in the Czech market. It provides services to individuals, as well as small and medium enterprises. The bank finances large corporations and provides services in the financial markets. It has issued 3.3 million debit and credit cards, and it also has the largest ATM network in the Czech Republic (about 1244). Almost 1.2 million customers use the bank's direct banking services. The network of branches includes more than 640 locations, including mortgage, commercial and development centers. The Česká spořitelna Foundation supports charitable projects in the fields of culture, education, science, public and social issues, healthcare, charitable, municipal events, sports and ecology. The bank employs almost 11,000 employees in all regions of the Czech Republic.

Social responsibility 
In December 2016, Česká spořitelna joined the Think Tank.

Services 
Its main clients are:
 individuals
 small and medium enterprises
 cities and municipalities
 large corporations
Its main products include:
 loans
 financial market consultancy
 payment cards
 ATMs
 online banking
 retail services, mortgage, development centers, etc.

Financial data

References 

Article contains translated text from Česká spořitelna on the Czech Wikipedia retrieved on 7 March 2017.

External links 
 Homepage

Banks of the Czech Republic
Banks established in 1825
19th-century establishments in Bohemia